Lirac is a commune in the Gard department in southern France.

Population

See also
Communes of the Gard department
 Lirac AOC

References

External links

 Commune website 

Communes of Gard